Monte Verita is a  mountain summit located in Boise County, Idaho, United States.

Description
Monte Verita is part of the Sawtooth Range which is a subset of the Rocky Mountains. The mountain is situated 11 miles south-southwest of Stanley, Idaho, in the Sawtooth National Recreation Area. Precipitation runoff from the mountain's slopes drains to the South Fork Payette River via Baron and Goat Creeks.

Etymology

This landform's toponym was officially adopted in 1960 by the United States Board on Geographic Names. It is named for the fictional mountain in the Daphne du Maurier story, Monte Verità. The Italian word translates as "Mount Truth" or "Mountain of Truth".

Climate
Based on the Köppen climate classification, Monte Verita is located in an alpine subarctic climate zone with long, cold, snowy winters, and cool to warm summers. Winter temperatures can drop below −10 °F with wind chill factors below −30 °F.

Subpeaks
Granite towers and spires of Monte Verita

See also
 List of mountain peaks of Idaho

References

External links
 Monte Verita: Idaho: A Climbing Guide
 Monte Verita: weather forecast

Mountains of Idaho
Mountains of Boise County, Idaho
North American 3000 m summits
Boise National Forest